Daniel James White (September 2, 1946 – October 21, 1985) was an American politician who assassinated  San Francisco Mayor George Moscone and Supervisor Harvey Milk, on Monday, November 27, 1978, at City Hall. White was convicted of manslaughter for the deaths of Milk and Moscone. White served five years of a seven-year prison sentence. Less than two years after his release, he returned to San Francisco, and later died by suicide.

Early life
White was born in Long Beach, California, the second of nine children. He was raised by Irish-American, working-class parents in the Visitacion Valley neighborhood of San Francisco. He attended Archbishop Riordan High School until he was expelled for violence in his junior year. He went on to attend Woodrow Wilson High School, where he was valedictorian of his class.

Career

White enlisted in the United States Army in June 1965. He was a sergeant with the 101st Airborne Division in the Vietnam War from 1969 to 1970 and was honorably discharged in 1971.

White worked as a security guard at A. J. Dimond High School in Anchorage, Alaska, in 1972. He returned to San Francisco to work as a police officer. According to a SF Weekly newspaper account, he allegedly quit the force after reporting another officer for beating a handcuffed suspect.

White then joined the San Francisco Fire Department. While on duty, according to the SF Weekly story, White's rescue of a woman and her baby from a seventh-floor apartment in the Geneva Towers was covered by the San Francisco Chronicle. The city's newspapers referred to him as "an all-American boy".

Election as supervisor
In 1977, White was elected as a Democrat to the San Francisco Board of Supervisors from District 8, which included several neighborhoods near the southeastern limits of San Francisco. At that time, supervisors were elected by district and not "at-large", as they had been before and then were again during the 1980s and 1990s. White had strong support from the police and firefighter unions. His district was described by The New York Times as "a largely white, middle-class section that is hostile to the growing homosexual community of San Francisco." The New York Times stated that as a supervisor, White saw himself as the board's "defender of the home, the family and religious life against homosexuals, pot smokers and cynics".

Tenure as supervisor
Despite their personal differences, White and Supervisor Harvey Milk had several areas of political agreement and initially worked well together. Milk was one of three people from City Hall invited to the baptism of White's newborn child shortly after the election. White also persuaded Dianne Feinstein, then president of the board of supervisors, to appoint Milk chairman of the Streets and Transportation Committee. White held a mixed record on gay rights, opposing the Briggs Initiative which sought to ban gays and lesbians from working in California's public schools, yet voting against an ordinance prohibiting discrimination against gays in housing and employment.

The Roman Catholic Church in April 1978 proposed a facility for juvenile offenders who had committed murder, arson, rape, and other crimes, to be operated by the Sisters of the Good Shepherd, in White's district. White strongly opposed the facility, while Milk supported it, and their difference of opinion led to a conflict between the two.

Assassinations of George Moscone and Harvey Milk

After a disagreement over a proposed drug rehabilitation center in the Mission District, White frequently clashed with Milk, as well as other members of the board. On November 10, 1978, White resigned his seat as supervisor. The reasons he cited were his dissatisfaction with what he saw as the corrupt practices of San Francisco city politics, as well as the difficulty of earning a living without a police officer's or firefighter's salary, jobs he could not retain legally while serving as a supervisor. White had opened a baked-potato stand at Pier 39, which failed to become profitable. He reversed his resignation on November 14, 1978, after his supporters lobbied him to seek reappointment from George Moscone.

Moscone initially agreed to White's request, but later refused the appointment at the urging of Milk and others. On November 27, 1978, White visited San Francisco City Hall with the later-declared intention of killing not only Moscone and Milk, but also two other San Francisco politicians, California Assembly Speaker Willie Brown (who would later serve as Mayor of San Francisco), and Supervisor Carol Ruth Silver, whom he also blamed for lobbying Moscone not to reappoint him. He climbed through a first-floor window on the side of City Hall carrying a Smith & Wesson Model 36 .38 caliber revolver and 10 rounds of ammunition. By entering the building through the window, White managed to avoid the recently installed metal detectors. After entering Moscone's office, White pleaded to be reinstated as supervisor, but Moscone refused. White then killed Moscone by shooting him in the shoulder and chest, and twice in the head. He then walked to the other side of City Hall to Milk's office, reloaded the gun, and fatally shot Milk five times, firing the final two shots with the gun's barrel touching Milk's skull, according to the medical examiner. White then fled City Hall, surrendering to the police at San Francisco's Northern Police Station where he had formerly been a police officer. While being interviewed by investigators, White recorded a tearful confession, stating, "I just shot him."

Trial and "Twinkie defense"

At the trial, White's defense team argued that his mental state at the time of the killings was one of diminished capacity due to depression. They argued that he was therefore not capable of premeditating the murders, and thus was not legally guilty of first-degree murder. Forensic psychiatrist Martin Blinder testified that White was suffering from depression and pointed to several behavioral symptoms of that depression, including the fact that White had gone from being highly health-conscious to consuming sugary foods and drinks. When the prosecution played a recording of White's confession, several jurors wept as they listened to what was described as "a man pushed beyond his endurance." Many people familiar with City Hall claimed that it was common to enter through the window to save time. A police officer friend of White claimed to reporters that several officials carried weapons at this time and speculated that White carried the extra ammunition as a habit that police officers had. The jury found White guilty of voluntary manslaughter rather than first-degree murder. Outrage within San Francisco's gay community over the resulting seven-year sentence sparked the city's White Night riots; general disdain for the outcome of the court case led to the elimination of California's "diminished capacity" law. Psychiatrist Thomas Szasz, a critic of forensic psychiatry, gave a speech to a large audience in San Francisco in June 1979 calling the White verdict a "travesty of justice" which he blamed on the diminished capacity defense.

Alleged confession 
In 1998, Frank Falzon, the homicide inspector with the San Francisco police to whom White had surrendered after the murders, said that he met with White in 1984, and that at this meeting White had confessed that he had intended to kill not only Moscone and Milk, but another supervisor, Carol Ruth Silver, as well as then-member of the California State Assembly and future San Francisco mayor Willie Brown. Falzon quoted White as having said, "I was on a mission. I wanted four of them. Carol Ruth Silver, she was the biggest snake ... and Willie Brown, he was masterminding the whole thing." Falzon indicated that he believed White, stating, "I felt like I had been hit by a sledge-hammer ... I found out it was a premeditated murder."

Imprisonment and suicide

White served five years of his seven-year sentence at Soledad State Prison and was paroled on January 7, 1984. Fearing White might be murdered in retaliation for his crimes, California State Corrections Officials secretly transported him to Los Angeles, where he served a year's parole. At the expiration of that year, White sought to return to San Francisco; Mayor Dianne Feinstein issued a public announcement of his plans and a statement formally asking White never to return to San Francisco. (Joel Wachs, a Los Angeles City Council member, also argued to keep White out of Los Angeles.) White eventually did move back to San Francisco and attempted to rebuild his life with his wife and children, without success.

On October 21, 1985, less than two years after his release from prison, White died by suicide from carbon monoxide poisoning in his garage. White's body was discovered by his brother, Thomas, shortly before 2:00 p.m. the same day.

White was buried at Golden Gate National Cemetery in San Bruno, California, with a traditional government-furnished headstone issued for war veterans. He was survived by his two sons, an infant daughter, and his widow.

Media adaptations
The story of the assassinations is told in the Academy Award-winning documentary film The Times of Harvey Milk (1984), which was released a year before White committed suicide.

The American hardcore punk rock band Dead Kennedys altered the lyrics to the song "I Fought The Law" to tell the story of the assassinations from White's perspective, which was released on the 1987 compilation Give Me Convenience or Give Me Death.

The Law & Order episode "Pride" is heavily based on Dan White's assassination of Harvey Milk.  The killer in the episode is a former police officer and current politician who assassinates a victim known for his support for gay rights.

White was portrayed by Josh Brolin in the 2008 film Milk. The film depicted White from his first meeting with Harvey Milk up to and including the assassination of Milk. Brolin's nomination for the Academy Award for Best Supporting Actor was one of eight nominations the film received overall.

White's life, the assassinations, and his trial are covered in the 1984 book Double Play: The San Francisco City Hall Killings by Mike Weiss, which won the Edgar Award as Best True Crime Book of the Year. An expanded second edition, Double Play: The Hidden Passions Behind the Double Assassination of George Moscone and Harvey Milk, was issued in 2010 and updated White's story to include his life after prison and his suicide. The second edition also includes a DVD with a half-hour video interview of White.

Execution of Justice, a play by Emily Mann, chronicles the events leading to the assassinations. In 1999, the play was adapted to film for cable network Showtime, with Tim Daly portraying White.

Harvey Milk is an opera in three acts composed by Stewart Wallace to a libretto by Michael Korie. A joint commission by Houston Grand Opera, New York City Opera, and San Francisco Opera, it was premiered on January 21, 1995, by Houston Grand Opera.

Notes

References

 
 
 Weiss, Mike (2010). Double Play: The Hidden Passions Behind the Double Assassination of George Moscone and Harvey Milk, Vince Emery Productions.

External links
 "48 Drawings from the trial by David Newman"
 

1946 births
1985 deaths
20th-century American criminals
American assassins
American firefighters
American male criminals
United States Army personnel of the Vietnam War
American people convicted of manslaughter
American politicians who committed suicide
American prisoners and detainees
American people of Irish descent
Burials at Golden Gate National Cemetery
California Democrats
Harvey Milk
Military personnel from California
People from Long Beach, California
Prisoners and detainees of California
San Francisco Board of Supervisors members
San Francisco Police Department officers
Suicides by carbon monoxide poisoning
Suicides in California
United States Army soldiers
1985 suicides